Christine Coe Winterbourn  is a New Zealand biochemist. She is a professor of pathology at the University of Otago, Christchurch. Her research in the biological chemistry of free radicals earned her the 2011 Rutherford Medal and the Marsden Medal, the top awards from each of New Zealand's two top science bodies.

Education
Winterbourn studied chemistry at the University of Auckland, followed by a PhD in biochemistry at Massey University.  Her PhD thesis was an investigation of the lipid metabolism of mammalian erythrocytes, exploring changes in the lipid profiles in these cells as a function of the cells' age.  She did postdoctoral work at the University of British Columbia, Canada. Her career since then has been spent at the University of Otago, Christchurch, where she has a chair in the Pathology Department.

Work
Winterbourn took a position at the University of Otago's Christchurch medical school in 1970. She set up her own laboratory in 1979/80, which grew into the Centre for Free Radical Research.
 
Her work explores the fundamental biochemistry of free radicals, which can have both beneficial and harmful effects in the body. She was one of the first scientists to demonstrate that human cells produce free radicals as part of their normal function. At low levels, they are essential to life, and contribute to the body's defences against infection, as well as playing a critical role in intracellular signalling. At higher levels, they can lead to oxidative stress, which has been implicated in a wide range of human diseases. Winterbourne did early work to document some of the chemical reactions of free radicals that occur in diseases such as cancer, stroke, coronary heart disease and arthritis.

Honours
Winterbourne was the first female recipient of the Rutherford Medal and in 1988 was elected a Fellow of the Royal Society Te Apārangi. In the 1997 Queen's Birthday Honours, Winterbourn was appointed an Officer of the New Zealand Order of Merit, for services to medical research. She was promoted to Companion of the New Zealand Order of Merit in the 2012 Queen's Birthday and Diamond Jubilee Honours, for services to science. In 2017, Winterbourn was selected as one of the Royal Society Te Apārangi's "150 women in 150 words", celebrating the contributions of women to knowledge in New Zealand.

References

External links
University of Otago Profile
Christine Winterbourn. Interview on RNZ, 2011

New Zealand pathologists
New Zealand medical researchers
Academic staff of the University of Otago
People from Christchurch
Living people
Recipients of the Rutherford Medal
Companions of the New Zealand Order of Merit
Women biochemists
Women pathologists
New Zealand women scientists
Place of birth missing (living people)
Year of birth missing (living people)
Fellows of the Royal Society of New Zealand